Gastón Sebastián Ada (born 18 November 1988) is an Argentine professional footballer who plays as a midfielder or forward for Los Andes.

Career
Ada began in the youth system of Boca Juniors, prior to having senior stints with fellow Argentine Primera División outfit Argentinos Juniors and Brazilian side Figueirense; though no league appearances followed. In 2011, Ada joined Deportivo Morón of Primera B Metropolitana. He netted the first goals of his career during the 2011–12 Primera B Metropolitana campaign, namely against General Lamadrid, Flandria and Nueva Chicago. Ada played just once in the following season, which preceded the player leaving for fellow third tier club Deportivo Merlo. He made the first of thirty-one appearances on 6 August 2013 versus Temperley.

July 2014 saw Ada sign for Acassuso. Two goals in forty-six fixtures came across two seasons with the team from Boulogne Sur Mer. He spent the next two campaigns with Primera B Nacional's Juventud Unida. Seven goals were scored in that period, one of which came in a match with Estudiantes - a team that then signed Ada on 10 August 2017. Ten months after, on 9 June 2018, Ada completed a move to Ferro Carril Oeste. After eight appearances in 2018–19, Ada terminated his contract on 2 August 2019 in order to join Deportes Valdivia of Primera B de Chile on 4 August.

Career statistics
.

References

External links

1988 births
Living people
People from Vicente López Partido
Argentine footballers
Association football midfielders
Association football forwards
Argentine expatriate footballers
Expatriate footballers in Brazil
Expatriate footballers in Chile
Argentine expatriate sportspeople in Brazil
Argentine expatriate sportspeople in Chile
Primera B Metropolitana players
Primera Nacional players
Argentinos Juniors footballers
Figueirense FC players
Deportivo Morón footballers
Deportivo Merlo footballers
Club Atlético Acassuso footballers
Juventud Unida de Gualeguaychú players
Club Sportivo Estudiantes players
Ferro Carril Oeste footballers
Deportes Valdivia footballers
Chaco For Ever footballers
San Telmo footballers
Club Atlético Los Andes footballers
Sportspeople from Buenos Aires Province